The 1977 Pacific typhoon season was one of the least active Pacific typhoon seasons on record, with only 19 tropical storms forming. It was also the second of three known typhoon seasons during the satellite era (since 1960) to not produce a Category 5-equivalent super typhoon, sandwiched between the 1974 and 2017 seasons. The season's first storm, Severe Tropical Storm Patsy, formed on March 23 and the last, Typhoon Mary, dissipated on January 2, 1978. With Mary spanning two calendar years, it became the fourth typhoon to do so since 1945. Since then, two other typhoons have achieved this feat.

The scope of this article is limited to the Pacific Ocean, north of the equator and west of the International Date Line. Storms that form east of the date line and north of the equator are called hurricanes; see 1977 Pacific hurricane season. Tropical Storms formed in the entire west pacific basin were assigned a name by the Joint Typhoon Warning Center. Tropical depressions in this basin have the "W" suffix added to their number. Tropical depressions that enter or form in the Philippine area of responsibility are assigned a name by the Philippine Atmospheric, Geophysical and Astronomical Services Administration or PAGASA. This can often result in the same storm having two names.

Season summary

Systems 
A total of 54 tropical depressions were recognized by the various warning agencies this year in the Western Pacific, of which 20 became tropical storms. Eleven storms reached typhoon intensity, of which three reached super typhoon strength.

Tropical Depression Atring 

Named by PAGASA.

Severe Tropical Storm Patsy 

Patsy stayed clear from land.

Tropical Depression 02W (Bining) 

2W was short-lived.

Severe Tropical Storm Ruth (Kuring) 

Ruth hit China.

Tropical Depression 04W (Daling) 

4W hit South China.

Typhoon Sarah (Elang) 

Sarah struck China.

Typhoon Thelma (Goring) 

A tropical disturbance east of the Philippines organized into a tropical depression on July 21. It moved to the northwest, strengthening into a tropical storm later that day and into a typhoon on the 22nd. After passing northern Luzon and dropping heavy rains, Thelma turned to the north, where it reached a peak intensity of 95 mph winds. The typhoon hit southern Taiwan on the 25th, crossed the island, and dissipated over southeastern China on the 26th. Though not a particularly strong storm, Thelma brought strong wind gusts and heavy rain, claiming more than 30 lives and bringing damage and destruction not seen to the island for over 80 years.

Typhoon Vera (Huling) 

Just 6 days after Thelma hit Taiwan, another typhoon was brewing to its east. Typhoon Vera, which developed on July 28, hit eastern Taiwan on the 31st as a 125 mph typhoon. It continued westward, and dissipated over southeastern China. The storm caused 25 additional fatalities to the island, with vast amounts of crop and property damage occurring.

Tropical Storm Wanda 

Wanda stayed at sea.

Severe Tropical Storm Amy (Ibiang) 

Amy hit Taiwan.

JMA Tropical Storm Eight 

This storm was short-lived.

Super Typhoon Babe (Miling) 

Developing as a tropical depression on September 2, Babe initially tracked west-northwestward as it intensified. On September 5, an abrupt shift in steering currents caused the system to turn north-northwestward. Not long after reaching this strength, another shift in the steering patterns caused the typhoon to execute a prolonged counter-clockwise arc, causing it to track through the Ryukyu Islands, as it interacted with a low pressure originating from the Korean Peninsula. During this time, the system gradually weakened and eventually it made landfall near Shanghai, China on September 11 as a minimal typhoon before dissipating inland the following day.

Passing through the Ryukyu Islands as a powerful typhoon, Babe caused considerable damage in the region. More than 1,000 homes were destroyed and nearly 7,000 more were damaged or flooded. One person was killed on Amami Ōshima and 77 others were injured throughout the country. Total losses reached ¥6.1 billion (US$23 million). Offshore, over 100 vessels were affected by the storm, including a Panamanian freighter where 13 people died. In China, more than 24,000 homes were destroyed and nine people were killed.

Tropical Storm Carla (Luming) 

Carla hit Vietnam.

Typhoon Dinah (Openg) 

The monsoon trough spawned a tropical storm on September 14 northeast of the northern Philippines. The previous typhoon brought the trough more northward, hence the unusually high latitude for a monsoon storm. Strong high pressure to Dinah's northwest forced the storm to the southwest, where it crossed northern Luzon on the 15th and 16th. Weak steering currents in the South China Sea allowed Dinah to drift, first then to the northeast then back to the west-southwest. Generally favorable conditions allowed Dinah to reach typhoon strength on the 19th, but a developing tropical storm to its northeast caused it to weaken. The building of the subtropical ridge forced Dinah to the southwest, where it hit southern Vietnam on the 23rd as a tropical depression. The remnants turned northward, crossed the Gulf of Tonkin, and dissipated over China on the 27th.

Dinah brought heavy rain and flooding to Luzon that killed 54 people and left 11 others missing.

Tropical Depression Narsing 

The depression lasted two days.

Severe Tropical Storm Emma 

Emma recurved from Japan.

Severe Tropical Storm Freda (Pining) 

Tropical Storm Freda struck Hong Kong killing one person.

Typhoon Gilda 

Gilda recurved from Japan.

JMA Tropical Storm Fifteen 

Existed way off Japan.

Tropical Depression Rubing 

The depression was short-lived.

Tropical Storm Harriet (Saling) 

Harriet stayed at sea.

Typhoon Ivy 

Ivy also stayed at sea.

Typhoon Jean 

Typhoon Jean was a tropical depression. It quickly became a tropical storm and on October 31, became a typhoon.

Tropical Depression Tasing 

This depression was short-lived.

Typhoon Kim (Unding) 

Typhoon Kim was a 150 mph super typhoon that hit the northern Philippines on November 13. The typhoon's heavy rains caused flash flooding that left 55 people dead with widespread damage. A further 47 people died when the upper floors of a hotel caught fire during the storm.

Typhoon Lucy (Walding) 

Lucy recurved from The Philippines.

Typhoon Mary (Yeyeng) 

Mary moved through the Marshall Islands.

Storm names 
Western North Pacific tropical cyclones were named by the Joint Typhoon Warning Center. The first storm of 1977 was named Patsy and the final one was named Mary.

Philippines 

The Philippine Atmospheric, Geophysical and Astronomical Services Administration uses its own naming scheme for tropical cyclones in their area of responsibility. PAGASA assigns names to tropical depressions that form within their area of responsibility and any tropical cyclone that might move into their area of responsibility. Should the list of names for a given year prove to be insufficient, names are taken from an auxiliary list, the first 6 of which are published each year before the season starts. Names not retired from this list will be used again in the 1981 season. This is the same list used for the 1973 season. PAGASA uses its own naming scheme that starts in the Filipino alphabet, with names of Filipino female names ending with "ng" (A, B, K, D, etc.).

Retirement 
Due to its impacts in the Philippines, PAGASA later retired the name Unding and was replaced by Unsing for the 1981 season. However, the name Unding would later be reused in the 2004 season, only for it to be re-retired by PAGASA due to its effects in Luzon.

Season effects 
This table will list all the storms that developed in the northwestern Pacific Ocean west of the International Date Line and north of the equator during 1977. It will include their intensity, duration, name, areas affected, deaths, missing persons (in parentheses), and damage totals. Classification and intensity values will be based on estimations conducted by the JMA. All damage figures will be in 1977 USD. Damages and deaths from a storm will include when the storm was a precursor wave or an extratropical low.

|-
| Atring ||  || bgcolor=#| || bgcolor=#| || bgcolor=#| || Philippines ||  Unknown ||  None ||
|-
| Patsy ||  || bgcolor=#| || bgcolor=#| || bgcolor=#| || Marshall Islands ||  None ||  None ||
|-
| 02W (Bining) ||  || bgcolor=#| || bgcolor=#| || bgcolor=#| || None ||  None ||  None ||
|-
| TD ||  || bgcolor=#| || bgcolor=#| || bgcolor=#| || Mariana Islands ||  None ||  None ||
|-
| TD ||  || bgcolor=#| || bgcolor=#| || bgcolor=#| || Philippines ||  None ||  None ||
|-
| Ruth (Kuring) ||  || bgcolor=#| || bgcolor=#| || bgcolor=#| || Philippines, China, Taiwan ||  Unknown ||  Unknown ||
|-
| TD ||  || bgcolor=#| || bgcolor=#| || bgcolor=#| || None ||  None ||  None ||
|-
| 04W (Daling) ||  || bgcolor=#| || bgcolor=#| || bgcolor=#| || South China ||  None ||  None ||
|-
| TD ||  || bgcolor=#| || bgcolor=#| || bgcolor=#| || Philippines ||  None ||  None ||
|-
| Sarah (Elang) ||  || bgcolor=#| || bgcolor=#| || bgcolor=#| || Palau, Philippines, South China, Vietnam ||  Unknown ||  Unknown ||
|-
| TD ||  || bgcolor=#| || bgcolor=#| || bgcolor=#| || Philippines ||  None ||  None ||
|-
| TD ||  || bgcolor=#| || bgcolor=#| || bgcolor=#| || Caroline Islands ||  None ||  None ||
|-
| Thelma (Goring) ||  || bgcolor=#| || bgcolor=#| || bgcolor=#| || Philippines, Taiwan, China ||  Unknown ||  ||
|-
| Vera (Huling) ||  || bgcolor=#| || bgcolor=#| || bgcolor=#| || Ryukyu Islands, Taiwan, China ||  Unknown ||  ||
|-
| Wanda ||  || bgcolor=#| || bgcolor=#| || bgcolor=#| || None ||  None ||  None ||
|-
| TD ||  || bgcolor=#| || bgcolor=#| || bgcolor=#| || None ||  None ||  None ||
|-
| TD ||  || bgcolor=#| || bgcolor=#| || bgcolor=#| || None ||  None ||  None ||
|-
| TD ||  || bgcolor=#| || bgcolor=#| || bgcolor=#| || Mariana Islands ||  None ||  None ||
|-
| TD ||  || bgcolor=#| || bgcolor=#| || bgcolor=#| || Japan ||  None ||  None ||
|-
| TD ||  || bgcolor=#| || bgcolor=#| || bgcolor=#| || None ||  None ||  None ||
|-
| TD ||  || bgcolor=#| || bgcolor=#| || bgcolor=#| || None ||  None ||  None ||
|-
| Amy (Ibiang) ||  || bgcolor=#| || bgcolor=#| || bgcolor=#| || Philippines, Taiwan, Ryukyu Islands, Japan ||  Unknown ||  Unknown ||
|-
| TD ||  || bgcolor=#| || bgcolor=#| || bgcolor=#| || None ||  None ||  None ||
|-
| TD ||  || bgcolor=#| || bgcolor=#| || bgcolor=#| || Ryukyu Islands ||  None ||  None ||
|-
| Eight ||  || bgcolor=#| || bgcolor=#| || bgcolor=#| || Japan ||  None ||  None ||
|-
| TD ||  || bgcolor=#| || bgcolor=#| || bgcolor=#| || Japan ||  None ||  None ||
|-
| TD ||  || bgcolor=#| || bgcolor=#| || bgcolor=#| || None ||  None ||  None ||
|-
| Carla (Luming) ||  || bgcolor=#| || bgcolor=#| || bgcolor=#| || Philippines, Vietnam, Laos ||  Unknown ||  None ||
|-
| Babe (Miling) ||  || bgcolor=#| || bgcolor=#| || bgcolor=#| || Caroline Islands, Ryukyu Islands, East China ||  ||  ||
|-
| TD ||  || bgcolor=#| || bgcolor=#| || bgcolor=#| || Japan ||  None ||  None ||
|-
| TD ||  || bgcolor=#| || bgcolor=#| || bgcolor=#| || Vietnam ||  None ||  None ||
|-
| TD ||  || bgcolor=#| || bgcolor=#| || bgcolor=#| || Caroline Islands ||  None ||  None ||
|-
| Dinah (Openg) ||  || bgcolor=#| || bgcolor=#| || bgcolor=#| || Philippines, Vietnam, Laos, Cambodia ||  Unknown ||  ||
|-
| TD ||  || bgcolor=#| || bgcolor=#| || bgcolor=#| || None ||  None ||  None ||
|-
| TD ||  || bgcolor=#| || bgcolor=#| || bgcolor=#| || Caroline Islands ||  None ||  None ||
|-
| Emma ||  || bgcolor=#| || bgcolor=#| || bgcolor=#| || Mariana Islands, Japan ||  None ||  None ||
|-
| Narsing ||  || bgcolor=#| || bgcolor=#| || bgcolor=#| || Philippines ||  None ||  None ||
|-
| Freda (Pining) ||  || bgcolor=#| || bgcolor=#| || bgcolor=#| || Philippines, South China ||  None ||  ||
|-
| TD ||  || bgcolor=#| || bgcolor=#| || bgcolor=#| || Ryukyu Islands ||  None ||  None ||
|-
| TD ||  || bgcolor=#| || bgcolor=#| || bgcolor=#| || None ||  None ||  None ||
|-
| Gilda ||  || bgcolor=#| || bgcolor=#| || bgcolor=#| || None ||  None ||  Nonr ||
|-
| TD ||  || bgcolor=#| || bgcolor=#| || bgcolor=#| || None ||  None ||  None ||
|-
| Fifteen ||  || bgcolor=#| || bgcolor=#| || bgcolor=#| || Japan ||  None ||  None ||
|-
| Rubing ||  || bgcolor=#| || bgcolor=#| || bgcolor=#| || Mariana Islands ||  None ||  None ||
|-
| Harriet (Saling) ||  || bgcolor=#| || bgcolor=#| || bgcolor=#| || None ||  None ||  None ||
|-
| Ivy ||  || bgcolor=#| || bgcolor=#| || bgcolor=#| || Mariana Islands ||  None ||  None ||
|-
| Jean ||  || bgcolor=#| || bgcolor=#| || bgcolor=#| || None ||  None ||  None ||
|-
| TD ||  || bgcolor=#| || bgcolor=#| || bgcolor=#| || None ||  None ||  None ||
|-
| Tasing ||  || bgcolor=#| || bgcolor=#| || bgcolor=#| || None ||  Unknown ||  Unknown ||
|-
| Kim (Unding) ||  || bgcolor=#| || bgcolor=#| || bgcolor=#| || Mariana Islands, Philippines ||  Unknown ||  ||
|-
| TD ||  || bgcolor=#| || bgcolor=#| || bgcolor=#| || None ||  None ||  None ||
|-
| TD ||  || bgcolor=#| || bgcolor=#| || bgcolor=#| || Philippines ||  None ||  None ||
|-
| Lucy (Walding) ||  || bgcolor=#| || bgcolor=#| || bgcolor=#| || Caroline Islands ||  None ||  None ||
|-
| Mary (Yeyeng) ||  || bgcolor=#| || bgcolor=#| || bgcolor=#| || Marshall Islands, Caroline Islands, Philippines ||  Unknown ||  Unknown ||
|-

See also 

 List of Pacific typhoon seasons
 1977 Pacific hurricane season
 1977 Atlantic hurricane season
 1977 North Indian Ocean cyclone season
 South-West Indian Ocean cyclone seasons: 1976–77, 1977–78
 Australian region cyclone seasons: 1976–77, 1977–78
 South Pacific cyclone seasons: 1976–77, 1977–78

References

External links 
 Japan Meteorological Agency
 Joint Typhoon Warning Center .
 China Meteorological Agency
 National Weather Service Guam
 Hong Kong Observatory
 Macau Meteorological Geophysical Services
 Korea Meteorological Agency
 Philippine Atmospheric, Geophysical and Astronomical Services Administration
 Taiwan Central Weather Bureau
 Digital Typhoon - Typhoon Images and Information
 Typhoon2000 Philippine typhoon website